Bobby Grier (born November 10, 1942) is an American football executive and coach.

Early life
Grier was born on November 10, 1942 in Detroit. He attended the University of Iowa, where he played running back for the Hawkeyes from 1961 to 1964.

Coaching career

High school
Grier began his coaching career in 1966 as an assistant coach at Waterford Kettering High School in Waterford, Michigan. He then served as the head coach at Detroit's Martin Luther King High School from 1970 to 1973.

College
In 1974, Grier moved to the college ranks, serving as running backs coach for Eastern Michigan University. He followed head coach Ed Chlebek to Boston College in 1978, becoming the school's first full-time black assistant coach.

NFL
In January 1981, Grier was named the offensive backfield coach at Northwestern University. However, two months later he took the same job with the New England Patriots. He was the team's first black coach since 1966. The team finished 2–14 and the entire coaching staff was fired. He returned to the Patriots in July 1982 as a scout. He returned as Patriots offensive backfield coach in 1985 under head coach Raymond Berry. That year the Patriots running backs rushed for 2,331 yards, fourth best in club history, and made their first ever Super Bowl. In 1986 he was given the additional title of running game coordinator. Grier was retained by Rod Rust and Dick MacPherson.

Executive
When Bill Parcells became the Patriots head coach in 1993, Grier was moved to the personnel department as the Patriots' director of pro scouting. In 1995 he was promoted to director of player personnel.

Following New England’s 6–10 1995 season, Patriots owner Robert Kraft shifted control of football operations away from Parcells to Grier. In the 1996 NFL Draft Grier, with Kraft’s blessing, selected Ohio State wide receiver Terry Glenn with the seventh overall pick over the wishes of Parcells, who wanted a defensive player. The team also used their fifth round pick on Christian Peter, who had a history of violence against women, without consulting NFL security. The Patriots released their rights to Peters 24 hours after The Boston Globe reported on his record. The Patriots made Super Bowl XXXI, however, Parcells, who was upset with losing his personnel powers to Grier, left for the New York Jets. Pete Carroll was hired to replace him and Grier was promoted to vice president of player personnel. As VP of player personnel, Grier was responsible for selecting draft busts Chris Canty and Sedrick Shaw, but also chose a number of players who produced well for the Patriots, including Damien Woody, Kevin Faulk and Tebucky Jones.

In 2000, Carroll was fired and new head coach Bill Belichick was given the final say on personnel matters. Grier left the Patriots after the 2000 NFL Draft. One of his final duties with the team was to perform extensive scouting work on Tom Brady, who the Patriots selected in the sixth round of the draft.

In May 2000, Grier joined the Houston Texans, where he worked as Associate Director of Pro Scouting and senior personnel advisor until his retirement on May 1, 2016. Wade Phillips credited Grier as being instrumental in the team selecting J. J. Watt with the 11th overall pick in the 2011 NFL Draft. In 2017, Grier joined the Miami Dolphins as a consultant.

Personal life
Grier is the father of Miami Dolphins general manager Chris Grier, and San Jose Sharks general manager (and former National Hockey League player) Mike Grier.

References

1942 births
Living people
American football running backs
Boston College Eagles football coaches
Coaches of American football from Michigan
Eastern Michigan Eagles football coaches
Iowa Hawkeyes football players
High school football coaches in Michigan
Houston Texans executives
New England Patriots coaches
New England Patriots executives
Players of American football from Michigan
Sportspeople from Detroit